Patrick Thomas "Pat" Neaton (born May 21, 1971) is an American former professional ice hockey player who played 9 games in the National Hockey League with the Pittsburgh Penguins during the 1993–94 season. The rest of his career, which lasted from 1993 to 2002, was mainly spent in the International Hockey League. Internationally Neaton played for the American national team at the 1994 and 1995 World Championships.

Biography
Neaton was born in Redford, Michigan. As a youth, he played in the 1984 Quebec International Pee-Wee Hockey Tournament with the Michigan Blades minor ice hockey team.

He was also the co-captain of the University of Michigan ice hockey team, before he played for the Pittsburgh Penguins.

He currently resides in Michigan.

Career statistics

Regular season and playoffs

International

Awards and honors

References

External links 

1971 births
Living people
American men's ice hockey defensemen
Cleveland Lumberjacks players
Ice hockey players from Michigan
Michigan Wolverines men's ice hockey players
Orlando Solar Bears (IHL) players
People from Wayne County, Michigan
Pittsburgh Penguins draft picks
Pittsburgh Penguins players
San Diego Gulls (IHL) players
Utah Grizzlies (IHL) players
Vienna Capitals players